Stefano Veltroni (16th century) was an Italian painter of the Renaissance period. He was a relation of Giorgio Vasari, and accompanied him as an assistant to Naples, Bologna, and Florence.

References

16th-century Italian painters
Italian male painters
Painters from Tuscany
Italian Renaissance painters
Year of death unknown
Year of birth unknown